Curtis Harris may refer to:

 Curtis W. Harris (1924–2017), African-American minister, civil rights activist, and politician in Virginia
 Curtis C. Harris, American oncologist and cancer researcher
 Curtis Harris (baseball) (1905–1947), American Negro league baseball player